A Woman's Revenge can refer to:

 A Woman's Revenge (play), a 1715 play by the British writer Christopher Bullock
 A Woman's Revenge (1921 film), a 1921 German film
 A Woman's Revenge (1990 film), a 1990 French film
 A Woman's Revenge (2012 film), a 2012 Portuguese film
 A Women's Revenge the debut album by rapper Feloni